Williams Lake is a city in the Central Interior of British Columbia, in the central part of a region known as the Cariboo. Williams Lake is the second largest city, by population of metropolitan area, in the Cariboo after neighbouring Quesnel. The city is famous for its Williams Lake Stampede, which was once the second largest professional rodeo in Canada after only the Calgary Stampede.

History

Williams Lake is named in honour of Secwepemc chief William, whose counsel prevented the Shuswap from joining the Tsilhqot'in in their uprising against the settler population.

The story of Williams Lake (called T'exelc by local First Nations communities of the region) begins as much as 4000 years ago. The story of Williams Lake written by those coming into the region from outside begins in 1860 during the Cariboo Gold Rush when Gold Commissioner Philip Henry Nind and William Pinchbeck, a constable with the British Columbia Provincial Police, arrived from Victoria to organize a local government and maintain law and order.

At the time, two pack trails led to the goldfields, one from the Douglas Road and the other through the Fraser Canyon. They met at Williams Lake, which made it a good choice for settlers and merchants. By 1861, Commissioner Nind had built a government house and had requested the funds to build a jail. With the centre of local government being at Williams Lake, the miners and businessmen all had to travel there to conduct their business and soon the town had a post office, a courthouse, a roadhouse and the jail that Nind had requested. Meanwhile, William Pinchbeck had not been idle and had built his own roadhouse, saloon and store. Eventually he would own most of the valley.

In 1863, the town was excited by the news of the construction of Cariboo Road, believing it would pass through their already established and important trading centre. However, the roadbuilder Gustavus Blin Wright rerouted the original trail so that it bypassed Williams Lake and went through 150 Mile House instead.

The Williams Lake by-pass doomed the city and accusations flew that Gustavus Blin Wright had changed the route for his own personal benefit as he owned a roadhouse at Deep Creek along the new route. Regardless of Wright's motives, Williams Lake was forgotten and wouldn't be reborn until over half a century later in 1919 with the construction of the Pacific Great Eastern Railway, later BC Rail and now CN Rail.

On July 5, 1867, the Roman Catholic Church established St. Joseph's Mission halfway between Williams Lake and 150 Mile House.  In 1891, the mission opened an Indian residential school, called St. Joseph's School.  The school became one of the most notorious Indian residential schools over the 90 years it operated.  A St. Joseph's School reunion in 2013 in Williams Lake led to the creation of Orange Shirt Day, a memorial to the victims of the Canadian Indian residential school system that is observed nationally.  A memorial monument to the victims of the school was also erected in 2013, in Boitanio Park.

In July 2017, the province of British Columbia declared a state of emergency with more than 200 fires burning, mostly in the central region of the province. Residents from Williams Lake along with other communities in central British Columbia such as Ashcroft and 100 Mile House were given evacuation orders and most of those affected went to either Prince George or Kamloops.

On August 15, 2022 the City of Williams Lake officially proclaimed the third week of August as LGBTQ2S Pride Week for the first time in the city’s history, and raised the incusive pride flag at city hall.

Economy
The primary industries in Williams Lake are forestry, logging, sawmilling, mining  and ranching.

Timber has a long history in Williams Lake, dating back to the 1950s when many independent sawmills such as the Jacobson Brothers operated in town.  In the 1990s and 2000s, the independent sawmills sold their businesses or merged to become larger operations.  Currently, West Fraser Timber and Tolko Industries operate sawmills in Williams Lake.

The Gibraltar Mine is the second-largest open-pit copper mine in Canada, operated by Taseko Mines. It is located just north of Williams Lake and employs many residents.

Climate

Williams Lake has a humid continental climate with warm summers. Spring is the driest time of year, and summer and winter are the wettest seasons respectively. Williams Lake receives about 2,000 hours of bright sunshine per year, which is more than most of the province. It is also located in the rain shadow of the coastal mountains.

Williams Lake – along with Billings, and nearby McLeese Lake – holds the record for the highest maximum temperature ever recorded in the province during the month of September. This occurred on September 4, 1988.

Thus the average temperature is significantly warmer in the city proper than the airport.

Demographics 

According to the same census, Williams Lake had a census agglomeration population of 23,608.

Ethnicity 
Below is the ethnic origin of people from the Williams Lake census agglomeration, as of the 2006 Canadian census. Note that percentages total more than 100% due to multiple responses e.g. German-East Indian, Norwegian-Irish-Polish.

In the thirty-year period between 1986 and 2016, the population of Williams Lake has been largely stable, growing slightly from 10,280 to 10,753.

Religion

Education
Williams Lake is served by Cariboo-Chilcotin School District 27. It has five public elementary schools teaching up to grade 6 and three StrongStart BC centres. These are Cataline Elementary (Cataline Strong Start Centre), Chilcotin Road Elementary, Marie Sharpe Elementary (Marie Sharpe StrongStart Centre), Mountview Elementary (Mountview StrongStart Centre), Nesika Elementary. There is also SD 27 OR#1 Wildwood, a StrongStart Outreach Centre. One secondary school, Lake City Secondary School, which was formed by an merger of Columneetza Secondary School and Williams Lake Secondary School in 2013, teaches grade 7 to 12 students. Alternative education provision is met by the Graduation Routes Other Ways (GROW) centre and the Skyline Alternate School program. The GROW Centre offers grades 10–12 for adults. Anne Stevenson Secondary School was closed in 2003 due to falling numbers of students.

There are three independent schools in Williams Lake: Sacred Heart Catholic School (K-7), Maranatha Christian School (K-12) and Cariboo Adventist Academy (K-12).

Colleges and universities
Thompson Rivers University has a campus in Williams Lake and offers a wide variety of programs and courses including university transfers, certificate and diploma programs, health and safety certification, trades and technology, and university and career preparation. The Cariboo Chilcotin Elder College is a local affiliate of Thompson Rivers University that offers programs and opportunities for people who are 50 years of age and older and interested in participating in the programs, courses and special events run by the college.

Sports and recreation
The Williams Lake Stampeders are the local ice hockey team, playing in the Central Interior Hockey League; their arena is the Cariboo Memorial Complex
 The Williams Lake TimberWolves resumed play in September 2009 in the British Columbia Hockey League (BCHL). Due to financial obligations, the BCHL has suspended the Williams Lake franchise indefinitely.
Williams Lake Golf and Tennis Club situated on the south side of town is home to a championship 18 hole course and full size tennis courts. There is also a full service restaurant known as the Fox’s Den.

Transportation

Williams Lake is located on the junction of Highway 97 and Highway 20.
Canadian National Railway offers freight service north to Prince George
Local public transportation consists of the BC Transit and HandyDART bus service.
Town Taxi and Williams Lake Taxi are two local cab companies in the city.
Adventure Charters offers round trip scheduled bus service to Kamloops, Prince George, and Surrey BC.

It was opened in 1956 by Transport Canada and on January 1, 1997 the ownership of the airport was transferred to the City of Williams Lake. The airport is served by Pacific Coastal Airlines, and Central Mountain Air with daily flights to Vancouver. There was a small seaplane base at Williams Lake Water Aerodrome but it is no longer in operation.

Local attractions

Williams Lake Stampede

Held annually, on the Canada Day long weekend, the Williams Lake Stampede features Canadian Professional Rodeo Association action including bull riding, barrel racing, Bareback riding, tie-down roping, steer wrestling, team roping and chuckwagon races. The Williams Lake Stampede plays host to many top cowboys and international rodeo competitors from Canada and the United States, most of which continue on the circuit to the Calgary Stampede, the following weekend.

The Stampede festivities also include a parade of floats from local organizations, such as 4-H groups, native bands, community service groups, the stampede royalty and local merchants. There is also a carnival with rides and games located near the stampede grounds.

Scout Island

It consists of a beach, picnic area, boat launch and several trails through mainly natural environment. Scout Island is actually two islands that are connected to the west end of Williams Lake by a causeway.

Located on the island is the Nature House, which provides a view of the marsh next to the island. It is run by the Williams Lake Field Naturalists and provides information, displays and programs dealing with the local environment.

The island is leased to Williams Lake by the owners, the Nature Trust of British Columbia.

Media

Television
 Shaw TV – local Community Access Channel (only available on Shaw Cable)

Radio
 AM 570 – CKWL, Country, "Country 570" formerly "The Wolf"
 FM 97.5 – CFFM-FM, Rock, "The GOAT," formerly "The Rush" and earlier "The Max".
 "The Goat" and "Country 570" are owned by Vista Radio and use www.MyCaribooNow.com website
 FM 92.1 – CBYK, CBC Radio One
 FM 94.3 – CISK Sikh Radio
 FM 95.1 – VOAR Christian Radio (broadcasting from Newfoundland)  
 FM 96.1 – VF2235, First Nations community radio, "Canadian First Nations Radio or CFNR"
 FM 100.7 – CJLJ-FM, community radio

Other radio services
There was a Loran-C station at Williams Lake.

Publications
 Williams Lake Tribune (owned by Black Press)
 Cariboo Advisor (owned by Black Press)
 Welcome to Williams Lake local news site

Notable people
 

 Ian Billcliff - Canadian cricketer
 Todd Doherty - Conservative Party of Canada MP for Cariboo-Prince George.
 Rick Hansen - athlete and disabilities activist
 Jake Ilnicki - rugby player
 Trevor Mack - filmmaker
 Roberto McLellan - professional boxer
 Kayla Moleschi - rugby player, Olympian
 Carey Price - hockey player
 Amrik Virk - politician, government official

Surrounding communities

Bibliography
 Cariboo-Chilcotin Pioneer People and Places Irene Stangoe

References

Notes

External links

Cities in British Columbia
Geography of the Cariboo
Populated places in the Cariboo Regional District